Silvio Quadrelli (1 August 1889 – 1970) was an Italian weightlifter. He competed in the men's lightweight event at the 1924 Summer Olympics.

References

External links
 

1889 births
1970 deaths
Italian male weightlifters
Olympic weightlifters of Italy
Weightlifters at the 1924 Summer Olympics
Sportspeople from Milan
20th-century Italian people